The Raleigh Mound (33KN32) is a Native American mound in the village of Fredericktown, Ohio, United States.  Built thousands of years ago, the mound is an important archaeological site.

The site's original name was "Rowley Mound", given in honor of a Mr. Rowley, the property owner.  Both spellings have been used by federal sources; different editions of United States Geological Survey maps use both spellings, the United States Board on Geographic Names officially determined to spell it "Rowley" in 1963, and the National Park Service lists it as "Raleigh" while noting "Rowley" as a variant.

Its precise size cannot be determined: the mound was built atop a small hill, and thousands of years of erosion have molded the two into a single shape. The mound was excavated at an uncertain time in the past, and the excavators recovered a distinctive artifact of a type of gorget known as an "expanded-center bar".

In 1975, the Raleigh Mound was listed on the National Register of Historic Places, qualifying because of its archaeological importance.  Significant to this designation was its relationship to the Stackhouse site, as the nearby placement of the latter's larger earthworks and village site meant that a detailed investigation of the mound would have a chance of providing archaeologists with an unusually detailed understanding of the people who built it.

References

Adena culture
Archaeological sites on the National Register of Historic Places in Ohio
National Register of Historic Places in Knox County, Ohio
Mounds in Ohio